Gianmatteo Centazzo (born 4 February 1970) is an Italian gymnast. He competed in eight events at the 1992 Summer Olympics.

References

1970 births
Living people
Italian male artistic gymnasts
Olympic gymnasts of Italy
Gymnasts at the 1992 Summer Olympics
Sportspeople from Venice